Ayang Utriza Yakin is an Indonesian-born scholar of Islamic Studies based in Belgium. 
He is a research associate at Université catholique de Louvain, a visiting professor at Ghent University, and researcher at Sciences Po. He is also active in the Nahdlatul Ulama movement since 2015, both in Indonesia and in its Belgian branch.

He graduated with a BA in Islamic law from the Faculty of Sharia and Law of the Syarif Hidayatullah State Islamic University Jakarta in Jakarta (1996-2001) and studied Islamic law at the University of al-Azhar, Cairo (2001-2002). Yakin obtained an MA (2003-2005) and PhD (2008-2013) in History and Philology from the Ecole des Hautes Etudes en Sciences Sociales (EHESS), Paris. During the period of 2005-7 he also returned to Indonesia and was a lecturer at UIN Jakarta.

Yakin was a visiting fellow and postdoctoral researcher at the Oxford Centre for Islamic Studies (OXCIS) at the University of Oxford (in 2012), at the Islamic Legal Studies Program (ILSP) of Harvard Law School, the University of Harvard (in 2013), at the Asia Leadership Fellow Program (ALFP), Tokyo, Japan (2016), and at the Chair of Law and Religion of the research institute of “Religions, Spiritualities, Cultures, Societies” (RSCS), at the Université catholique de Louvain (UCLouvain), Belgium (2016 to 2019).

Since 2021, he is a research associate at the Chair of Law and Religion at the RSCS institute at UCLouvain), Belgium, and postdoctoral researcher at Sciences Po Bordeaux, France, working on the ANR-funded project ‘Equality and Law in Personal Status’. In 2021 he has also been on the committee of a group attempting to build a new mosque in Brussels.

Selected publications 

  (In Indonesian, Kencana, 2016) 
  (In Indonesian, Kencana, 2016)
 Rethinking Halal: Genealogy, Current Trends, and New Interpretations (In English, Brill, 2021)
 Hidup dalam Doa (In Indonesian, Bentang Pustaka, 2022)
 Islamic Divorce in the Twenty-First Century, A Global Perspective (In English, Rutgers University Press, 2022) 
 Islam Praksis; Keberislaman yang Aqli, Naqli, dan Tarikhi (In Indonesian, IRCISOD, 2022) 
 Bahkan Tuhan pun Tak Tega Jika Kita Menderita ( In Indonesian, Bentang Pustaka, 2022)

References 

1978 births
Living people
School for Advanced Studies in the Social Sciences alumni
Islamic studies scholars
Al-Azhar University alumni
Syarif Hidayatullah State Islamic University Jakarta alumni
Academic staff of Ghent University
Academic staff of the Université catholique de Louvain
Nahdlatul Ulama